Bam Bam Bol Raha Hai Kashi is a 2016 Indian Bhojpuri language film directed by Santosh Mishra and produced by Madhu Chopra and Priyanka Chopra. Dinesh Lal Yadav cast in lead role along with Amrapali Dubey and Antara Banerjee while Manoj Tiger, Sanjay Pandey, Prakash Jais, Deepak Sinha, Ayaz Khan, Dr Archana Singh an Samarth Chaturvedi in supporting roles.

Cast

 Dinesh Lal Yadav "Nirahua" as Kashi Pandey
 Amrapali Dubey as Suman Singh
 Antara Banerjee as Nandani
 Manoj Tiger as Jagan
 Sanjay Pandey as Bandook Singh
 Prakash Jais as Tantan (Kashi's friend)
 Deepak Sinha as the Police inspector
 Samarth Chaturvedi as Batkhari Singh
 Sanjay Verma as Makkhan
 Santosh Shrivastav as Bacchu Singh
 Tej Pratap Yadav as Dinanath Pandey (Kashi's father)
 Kiran Yadav as Janaki (Kashi's mother)
 Ayaz Khan as Toni
 Asgar Khan as Asgar
 Dr Archana Singh as Rajmata
 Ravi Shankar Jaiswal as Sub inspector
 Sweety Singh as Bhairavi

Production
It is the first film of Priyanka Chopra's own production house named "Purple Pebble Pictures" under which she planned to produce five regional films. The first one to roll out of was the Bhojpuri film "Bam Bam Bol Raha Hai Kashi". Bengali actress Antara Benarjee makes his Bhojpuri debut with this film. The script of this film has been written by Santosh Mishra, who also the director of this film. Music is given by Rajnish Mishra and Madhukar Anand, while background music is scored by Rahul B Seth. "Kavita & Sunita Creation" designed costumes for the entire cast. Rabiul Sarkar has in charge of art direction. The cinematography is by Rafiq Latif Shaikh, and Santosh Harawade is the editor. Martial Ramana has directed the action and stunts in the film. Kanu Mukharjee have choreographed the dance numbers. Post-production was done by "Audio Lab Studio". Graphics are done by Ritesh Daftary (Visual FX Studio).

The film was primarily shot in beautiful locations of Gujarat with some scenes shot in Sai Kutir and Tulsi Vihar in Mumbai.

Release
The film was theatrically released on 16 June 2016 across all India.

Soundtrack
The soundtrack for "Bam Bam Bol Raha Hai Kashi" was composed by Rajnish Mishra and Madhukar Anand with lyrics written by Pyare Lal Yadav, Azad Singh, and Shyam Dehati. The music of the film was released by T-Series.

References

External links
 

2016 films
2016 action drama films
Indian action drama films
2016 masala films
2010s Bhojpuri-language films